Herol Riiberg (born 14 April 1997) is an Estonian professional footballer who plays as an attacking midfielder for Estonian Meistriliiga club Paide Linnameeskond.

Honours

Club
Flora
Meistriliiga: 2015, 2017, 2019
Estonian Cup: 2015–16
Estonian Supercup: 2014, 2016

References

External links

1997 births
Living people
Footballers from Tallinn
Estonian footballers
Association football defenders
Meistriliiga players
FC Flora players
Estonia youth international footballers
Estonia under-21 international footballers